Yubileyny is a rural locality (a village) in Pogorelovskoye Rural Settlement, Totemsky  District, Vologda Oblast, Russia. The population was 1,658 as of 2002. There are 22 streets.

Geography 
Yubileyny is located 65 km southwest of Totma (the district's administrative centre) by road. Toporikha is the nearest rural locality.

References 

Rural localities in Totemsky District